Château les Carmes Haut-Brion is a Bordeaux wine estate located in the AOC Pessac-Léognan within the region of Graves.

In addition to producing a red grand vin named Château les Carmes Haut-Brion, the estate produces the red second wine Le C des Carmes.

History
In 1584, Jean de Pontac Lord of Haut-Brion donated a windmill on the banks of the Peugue river, surrounded by vines and adjoining outbuildings, to the Roman Catholic Grand Carmelite Order in Bordeaux. In 1630, the Grand Carmelite Order expanded the estate by purchasing vines located in the ‘aubrion’ area. The Carmelites owned the estate for two hundred years and retained the ‘Haut-Brion’ name, which gradually became ‘Carmes Haut-Brion’. The estate became a national asset in 1791 when Church holdings were seized during the French Revolution. Wine merchant Léon Colin then purchased it in 1840 and renamed it Carmes-Haut-Brion. He subsequently passed the estate down to his descendants, the Chantecaille family, who built the current chateau at the beginning of the 19th century, as well as creating the park designed by landscape architect Louis-Bernard Fisher (who notably designed the Jardin Public gardens in Bordeaux). This estate remained in the family until 2010.

Patrice Pichet and Château les Carmes Haut-Brion 
Patrice Pichet, the head of France's family-run real estate group, acquired the estate at the end of 2010. As a great wine enthusiast and collector, Patrice Pichet sought to turn this unique ten-hectare estate into a genuine jewel set in the city of Bordeaux. To achieve this, he has surrounded himself with top professionals – Guillaume Pouthier, the director of operations, and Stéphane Derenoncourt, who has been the estate's consultant for several years – and made all the right choices regarding vine monitoring, vineyard expansion and winemaking. The initial purchase was followed by the acquisition of complementary plots, in particular 17 hectares in a single stretch, bringing the estate to its current size of 35 hectares. Unique and ambitious new facilities were created to support this momentum. New winery and reception areas designed and created by Philippe Starck and Luc Arsène-Henry were inaugurated in 2016, marking the resolutely iconic intentions of this new chapter beginning at Carmes Haut-Brion.

The vineyard

The historic vineyard 
Château les Carmes Haut-Brion is the only Bordeaux chateau to be actually in Bordeaux, at the unique address of 20, Rue des Carmes. Although the vineyard was historically ‘outside the walls’, it is now entirely within the city, a walled vineyard in urban surroundings. The exceptional location of the estate, ten hectares in size including six hectares of vineyards, means that it enjoys a privileged environment with a milder microclimate and a well-preserved ecosystem that work together to ensure perfectly ripe grapes. The terroir, a mixture of Mindel gravel, sand, and clay over a limestone subsoil, forms a unique geological spectrum that has informed this vineyard's unusual mix of grape varieties, consisting of 40% Cabernet Franc, 18% Cabernet Sauvignon and the remainder Merlot. The vines are an average of 42 years old and are planted with a density of 10,000 per hectare.

This singular location and unique mix of grape varieties give Carmes Haut-Brion a strong identity as an exceptional vineyard.

The modern vineyard 

The estate has expanded to incorporate complementary plots in the villages of Martillac, Cadaujac and Saint Médard D’Eyrans, that have been purchased progressively since 2011, bringing the total area today to 35 hectares. These plots are used to produce the estate's other signature wine, Le C des Carmes Haut-Brion, and have their own modern production facility in the village of Martillac. The vineyards are planted with 62% Cabernet Sauvignon, 35% Merlot and 3% Petit Verdot and are now 13 years old on average. They grow in a terroir consisting of Gunz gravel, sand and clay.

Winemaking

Wine making 
The winemaking process is sustainable and draws on traditional methods. Since 2009, the soils have been worked completely organically (using only natural products) with the greatest respect for the site. Harvesting is by hand and tractors are gradually being replaced by horses. Since 2012, winemaking has used whole grapes with a small portion of the stems and been carried out in vats of 21 to 86 hectolitres in size. The top wine is matured in oak barrels (75% new oak), large casks and terracotta amphoras for a period of 18 to 24 months.

Le C des Carmes Haut-Brion is matured in 30% new oak barrels for 12 to 18 months, and then in cement vats.

Equipment 
When Patrice Pichet acquired the estate, he considered it essential to install new equipment in keeping with the high quality ambitions of this prestigious vineyard. For this project he commissioned designer Philippe Starck and architect Luc Arsène-Henry to design and create an architectural ensemble that prioritises technical efficiency.

The winery, which welcomed its first harvests in 2015 and was inaugurated in June 2016, covers an area of around 2,000 m2 and has four separate floors to house reception and technical activities. The maturing cellar on the first floor can hold 300 barrels, which are kept beneath a body of water to provide a naturally tailored temperature and hygrometry. On the second floor, a 200 m2 area is set aside for receiving harvests and communicates directly with a 1,200-hectolitre vat house that operates by natural gravity. The vats are a variety of sizes and alternate between three different materials: wood, stainless steel and concrete. The two uppermost floors of the winery are devoted to tasting and to welcoming customers.

To differentiate it from the chateau's other signature wine, Patrice Pichet decided to give Le C des Carmes Haut-Brion its own modern, high-performance production facility in the village of Martillac.

References

External links
Château Les Carmes Haut-Brion official site 

Bordeaux wine producers